Onamalu ( Alphabet) is a 2012 Telugu-language philosophical film, produced & directed by Kranthi Madhav on Sunshine Cinema banner. Starring Rajendra Prasad, Kalyani  and music composed by Koti. The film premiered on 22 June 2012. The film is a debut for director Kranthi Madhav's into the film industry and known Telugu literary personality Mohd Khadeer Babu first time penned dialogue for the film. The film received CineMAA Awards for Best debut Director and Best outstanding Actor.

Plot
Narayana Rao (Rajendra Prasad) is a patriotic and simple village schoolmaster, who takes immense pleasure in working for the betterment of his students and his village. The movie shows Narayana Rao returning from the US to his native village after a long gap. While sentiments and affection used to be the guiding forces in the village he left, commercialism and greed are the dominant forces in the village he returns to. Stung by the changes his village has undergone and ashamed with the rapid decline in human values due to urbanization, Narayana Rao sets about repairing the damage time has caused. In between, flashback episodes show the life Narayana Rao used to lead in his village and the bonds shared between members of various communities. Will Narayana Rao be able to arrest the damage and bring about a realization in people? That forms the story of Onamaalu.

Cast

Rajendra Prasad as Narayana Rao Master
Kalyani as Rukmini
Chalapathi Rao as President
Giri Babu as Peddi Raju
Raghu Babu as Erramanjil
Kondavalasa as Military Chowdary
Praveen as Sundaram
Ravi Prakash as Khadar
Ananth as Mangapati Master
Jenny
Sasidhar as Venkatesh
Sarika Ramachandra Rao as Cyclone Subba Rao
Chitti as Rama Krishna
Siva Parvathi as Mahalakshmi
Meena as Nazhira
Maheswari as Sarala
Poornima
Bhavani as Lata

Soundtrack

Music composed by Koti. Lyrics were written by Sirivennela Sitarama Sastry. Music released on ADITYA Music Company.

Awards 2012
CineMAA Awards
CineMAA Award for Best Debut Director - Kranthi Madhav
CineMAA Award for Best Outstanding Actor - Rajendra Prasad
Chennai Telugu Academy Awards - Kranthi Madhav - Best Feature Film 
Santosham Awards- Kranthi Madhav- Best Feature Film
ANR - Abhinandana Awards - Best Feature Film, Best Debut Director - Kranthi Madhav 
Bharatamuni Awards - Best Message Oriented Film, Best Debut Director - Kranthi Madhav

References

External links
http://www.cinemahour.com/events/moviestills/Onamalu-Movie-Stills.html
http://www.song.cineradham.com/song.php?movieid=2608&moviename=Onamaalu(2012)

2012 films
2012 drama films
2010s Telugu-language films
Films scored by Koti
2012 directorial debut films
Indian drama films